Heather J. Kulik is an American computational materials scientist and engineer who is an associate professor of chemical engineering at the Massachusetts Institute of Technology. Her research considers the computational design of new materials and the use of artificial intelligence to predict material properties.

Early life and education 
Kulik earned her bachelor's degree in Chemical Engineering at Cooper Union in 2004. She moved to the Massachusetts Institute of Technology for her graduate studies, where she joined the Department of Materials Science and Engineering and worked under the supervision of Nicola Marzari. During her doctoral research, she introduced a Hubbard U term to density functional theory calculations, which improved the study of transition metal complexes. Density functional theory allows for the prediction and study of new materials with limited computational cost. Amongst these materials, Kulik concentrated on transition metal complexes, as their highly localized electrons make the unphysical decollimation that occurs in the simplifications of DFT inappropriate. She graduated in 2009 with her Ph.D. in Materials Science and Engineering.

Kulik then conducted postdoctoral research with Felice Lightstone at the Lawrence Livermore National Laboratory. She then worked alongside Todd Martínez at Stanford University and Judith Klinman at the University of California, Berkeley on the large-scale electronic structures of biomolecules.

Research and career 
In 2013, Kulik joined the faculty at the Massachusetts Institute of Technology as the Joseph R. Mares Career Development Chair. She specializes in computational modeling and artificial intelligence to accelerate the discovery of new materials and catalysts. In particular, Kulik develops new strategies to improve the accuracy of density functional theory.

Awards and honors 
 2017 I&ECR, Class of 2017 Influential Researcher
 2018 DARPA Young Faculty Award
 2019 Journal of Physical Chemistry Lectureship Award
 2019 National Science Foundation CAREER Award
 2019 AAAS Marion Milligan Mason Award
 2019 Princeton University Saville Lecturer
 2019 Novartis Early Career Award
 2020 DARPA Director's Fellowship Award
 2021 Sloan Research Fellowship

Selected publications

References 

Massachusetts Institute of Technology alumni
Massachusetts Institute of Technology faculty
Cooper Union alumni
American women physicists
Artificial intelligence researchers
Year of birth missing (living people)
Living people